Dolores Lambaša (29 March 1981 − 23 October 2013) was a Croatian actress.

Death
Lambaša died of injuries sustained in traffic collision on 23 October 2013, aged 32, at the Dr. Josip Benčević Hospital in Slavonski Brod.

Filmography

Television roles

Film roles

Theatre roles 
 Federico García Lorca: Bernarda Alba's home, as HNK Zagreb (2006)

References

External links

1981 births
2013 deaths
People from Šibenik
21st-century Croatian actresses
Croatian stage actresses
Croatian television actresses
Croatian film actresses
Road incident deaths in Croatia